The 2008 Girls' Youth NORCECA Volleyball Championship was played from 5 to 10 July 2008 in Guaynabo, Puerto Rico. Seven teams competed in this tournament. United States won the tournament for the fifth time defeating Mexico. Dominican Republic joined the United States and Mexico to compete at the 2009 Girls' U18 World Championship.

Competing nations

Squads

Preliminary round
All times are in Atlantic Standard Time (UTC−04:00)

Group A

Group B

Final round

Championship bracket

Quarterfinals

|}

6/7 classification

|}

Fifth place match

|}

Semifinals

|}

Bronze medal match

|}

Final

|}

Final standing

References

External links
Official Website
Regulations

Women's NORCECA Volleyball Championship
P
Volleyball
2008 in women's volleyball